Robin S Ngangom (born 1959) is an Indian poet and translator from Manipur, North Eastern India.

Biography
Robin Singh Ngangom was born in Imphal, Manipur of North Eastern India. He is a bilingual poet who writes in English and Meiteilon. He studied literature at St Edmund's College and the North Eastern Hill University Shillong, where he teaches. His books of poetry include Words and the Silence (1988) published by Writers Workshop, Time's Crossroads (1994) and The Desire of Roots (2006). His essay, Poetry in a Time of Terror appeared in The Other Side Of Terror: An Anthology Of Writings On Terrorism In South Asia published by Oxford University Press, New Delhi (2009). He was conferred with the Katha Award for Translation in 1999.

Bibliography

Books
The Desire of Roots ( Poetry in English ). Cuttack: Chandrabhaga, India 2006
Time's Crossroads ( Poetry in English ). Hyderabad: Orient Longman Ltd, India 1994. 
Words and the Silence ( Poetry in English ). Kolkata: Writers Workshop, India 1988

See also

Indian English Poetry

References

1959 births
Indian male poets
English-language poets from India
Living people
North-Eastern Hill University alumni
20th-century Indian poets
Poets from Manipur
20th-century Indian male writers